Matt Dunnerstick is an American film director.

His first film, The Custom Mary, premiered at the 2011 New York International Latino Film Festival and also at the 2012 San Diego Black Film Festival, where it simultaneously won Best Cutting Edge film and Best Religious Topic Film, in addition to being nominated for Best Director, Best Feature, and Best Overall Film. It went on to play through the indie film circuit, particularly at Latino and Black film festivals, winning 8 awards and 4 nominations in the process.

He is also involved in numerous digital art projects, including the author CAPitALLism (2003), a manifesto on progressive tax and maximum wage that has been feature in various galleries and art installations such as FILE, Rhizome, and a minima.  His piece Spreading self-authority (2007) has been featured in the Journal of Aesthetics & Protest.

References

External links 

American film directors
Living people
Year of birth missing (living people)